Aleksandr Alekseyevich Chernyshov (21 August 1882 – 28 April 1940), anglicised Alexander Chernyshov, was an electrical engineer. He graduated from Saint Petersburg Polytechnical Institute in 1907, and worked there until the end of his life. His research consisted of radio engineering and high-voltage techniques. He won the Lenin Prize in 1930.

References
All Russian Genealogical Tree

Soviet engineers
Engineers from the Russian Empire
Peter the Great St. Petersburg Polytechnic University alumni
1882 births
1940 deaths
Burials at Bogoslovskoe Cemetery